The year 1661 in music involved some significant events.

Events
April 19 – Maria Cattarina Calegari takes her final vows and becomes a nun at the Benedictine Convent of Santa Margherita in Milan.
November 4 – Samuel Pepys' diary records a visit to the opera.
King Louis XIV of France creates the Académie Royale de Danse.
Jean-Baptiste Lully becomes a French subject.
First public opera performances in Antwerp, on the stage of the Schouwburgh van de Oude Voetboog.

Classical music
Thomas Gobert – Pseaume XVIII
Matthew Locke – Flatt Consort
Heinrich Schütz – Becker Psalter (revised and enlarged edition)
Gaspar de Verlit – , vol. 1

Opera
Antonio Bertali – Il Ciro crescente
Jacopo Melani – Ercole in Tebe
Antonio Sartorio – Gl'amori infruttuosi di Pirro

Births
February – Henri Desmarets, composer (died 1741)
February 5 – Barbara Kluntz, composer (died 1730)
June 6 – Giacomo Antonio Perti, composer (died 1756)
September 2 – Georg Böhm, organist and composer (died 1733)
November 1 – Florent Carton (Dancourt), librettist (died 1725)
date unknown – Francesco Gasparini, composer (died 1727)

Deaths
May 4 – Jean de Cambefort, composer (born 1605)
May 9 – Alberich Mazak, composer (born 1609)
June 3 – Gottfried Scheidt, organist and composer (born 1593)
August 29 – Louis Couperin, harpsichordist and composer (born c.1626)
October – Germain Pinel, harpsichordist and composer (born c. 1600)
November 16 – João Lourenço Rebelo, composer (born 1610)
December 29 – Antoine Girard, librettist (born 1594)

 
Music
17th century in music
Music by year